The Network of International Christian Schools (NICS) is an organization that consists of 15 schools in 13 countries in Asia, Africa, South America, Europe and includes an online school in North America. There are plans in the works for more schools in the near future.

History 

In 1983, Joe Hale, his wife Ann, and some other missionaries formed Liberty Christian School (International Christian School) in South Korea. They initially anticipated that this school would educate about 30 students, but on the school’s inaugural day 83 students arrived for classes. The school continued to grow, and currently there are three NICS schools in South Korea with a total enrollment of over 1200 students.

It quickly became apparent that the need for international schools, particularly Christian ones, was present in many countries beyond Korea. Schools perpetuating the same approach soon appeared in other countries and on other continents. The vast growth of the initial schools was such that the Network of International Christian Schools (NICS) was born in 1991 and a home office was established in Memphis, TN to facilitate the operations and staffing of the schools. In 1992, NICS became an incorporated independent mission agency. In 2001 the home office was moved to Southaven, MS, a suburb of Memphis, where it is today.  After operating out of the Southaven municipal building for several years, the current location (3790 Goodman Rd. E.) was secured and occupied in the fall of 2007.
  
There are plans for additional buildings to be built, which will also be used as a conference and training facility. The home office houses 25 employees, as well as the offices of NorthStar International Academy, the online school. Joe Hale serves as the president of NICS and works out of the home office, or international headquarters. Future plans also include the building of a stateside international school.

The peak enrollment of all NICS schools at the time during the 2020-21 school year is over 5000 students. There are over 800 teachers serving the 15 schools throughout the organization.

List of schools
 Bandung Alliance Intercultural School, Bandung, Indonesia
 International Christian Academy of Nagoya, Nagoya, Japan (closed)
 West Nairobi School, Nairobi, Kenya
 International Community School, Singapore
 Yongsan International School, Seoul, South Korea
 International Christian School, Uijeongbu
 Prishtina High School, Prishtina, Kosovo (Oasis School)
 International School, Far East (Oasis School)

References

External links
Official Network of International Christian Schools website

 01
Christian schools
International school associations